Bernest Cain (born February 8, 1949) is an American politician who served in the Oklahoma Senate from the 46th district from 1978 to 2006.

References

1949 births
Living people
Democratic Party Oklahoma state senators